Renée and Renato were a female/male vocal duo, who had a UK number-one hit in December 1982 with "Save Your Love". The follow-up single "Just One More Kiss" peaked at No. 48. Their third single, "Jesus Loves Us All", failed to reach the UK Singles Chart.

West Midlands-resident Italian-born Renato Pagliari  auditioned for ITV's talent show New Faces in 1975, catching the attention of songwriter, Johnny Edward, who had written "Save Your Love". He was teamed by Edward with British singer Hilary Lester and the duo was renamed as Renée and Renato. They recorded the song, "Save Your Love", which became the 1982 Christmas number one and peaked at number 3 in Australia in 1983.
By that stage Lester had already joined another group, and the contractually enforced follow-ups.
"Just One More Kiss" peaked at number 55 in Australia.

Lester returned to private life after the fame died down, but Renato still sang, mainly on cruise ships and occasionally at his son's restaurant, Renato's, in Tamworth, Staffordshire. His later credits included a guest spot on the TV comedy show Little and Large. He is also rumoured to have been the singer for the Wall's ice cream jingle "Just One Cornetto"  (although this is claimed not to be the case by Pagliari's son, Remo). He also issued several albums.

Renato was a fan of Aston Villa F.C. and during the early 1990s was asked by manager Ron Atkinson to sing "Nessun dorma" at half time following a particularly poor first half performance by the team. On completion of his performance Atkinson told the players "Now that is passion! Go and show me some of that in the second half"! When Atkinson appeared on the TV show Room 101, Atkinson claimed that only Luciano Pavarotti could sing "Nessun Dorma" better than Renato.

Death
Renato died from complications following surgery on a brain tumour at Good Hope Hospital, Sutton Coldfield, on 29 July 2009, aged 69.

Discography

Albums

Renato albums

Singles

Renato singles

References

British pop music duos
Male–female musical duos